Battle of Alexandria, Raid on Alexandria, or Siege of Alexandria may refer to one of these military operations fought in or near the city of Alexandria, Egypt:
 Siege of Alexandria (169 BC), during the Syrian Wars
 Siege of Alexandria (47 BC), during Caesar's Civil War
 Battle of Alexandria (30 BC), fought between Roman forces during the Final War of the Roman Republic
 Siege of Alexandria (619), conducted by the Sassanid Empire against a Byzantine Empire garrison between 618 and 620 during the Sassanid conquest of Egypt
 Siege of Alexandria (641), conducted by the Rashidun army against the Byzantine capital during the Muslim Conquest of Egypt
 Siege of Alexandria (1174), Norman Sicilian attack
 Alexandrian Crusade (1365)
 Battle of Alexandria (1798), fought between French and Mamaluk forces during the Napoleonic campaign in Egypt
 Battle of Alexandria (1801), 21 March, a major battle fought between British and French forces during the French Revolutionary War
 Siege of Alexandria (1801), 17 August – 2 September, the subsequent British siege of the city and  French surrender
 Greek raid on Alexandria (1825), a raid on Alexandria harbour during the Greek War of Independence
 Bombardment of Alexandria (1881), British naval bombardment of the city
 Raid on Alexandria (1941), an attack on British shipping by Italian special forces during the Second World War